The 2012 United States presidential election in Michigan took place on November 6, 2012, as part of the 2012 United States presidential election in which all 50 states plus the District of Columbia participated. Voters chose 16 electors to represent them in the Electoral College via a popular vote pitting incumbent Democratic President Barack Obama and his running mate, Vice President Joe Biden, against Republican challenger and former Massachusetts Governor Mitt Romney and his running mate, Congressman Paul Ryan.

Michigan was won by Democrat Barack Obama with 54.21% of the vote to Romney's 44.71%, a victory margin of 9.5%. It was the sixth presidential election in a row where Michigan voted in favor of the Democratic candidate, with Republicans last carrying the state in 1988. Obama's margin of victory was significantly decreased from 2008 when he carried the state by 16.44%, and he lost 26 counties that had voted for him four years prior. Many of those counties had gone Democratic for the first time in decades, such as Berrien County, which had not voted for a Democrat since Lyndon B. Johnson in 1964. The state's Republican trend would continue, as Donald Trump would end up narrowly winning the state and flipping even more counties in 2016. Nevertheless, it would return to the Democratic column in the following cycle when it narrowly backed Joe Biden over Trump.

As of 2020, this is the last time Michigan voted more Democratic than the nation, as well as the last time it voted to the left of Colorado, Virginia, New Hampshire, and Minnesota. Due to the latter, 2012 is the last time Michigan was the most Democratic state in the Midwest after Illinois. It was also the last time that Bay County, Calhoun County, Eaton County, Gogebic County, Isabella County, Lake County, Macomb County, Manistee County, Monroe County, Shiawassee County, and Van Buren County voted for a Democratic candidate.

Primaries

Democratic
The Democratic Party used a caucus system to determine the proportion of delegates awarded to Democratic candidates. The caucuses took place May 5; as the only Democratic candidate, President Obama won all 183 pledged delegates in the caucus. They, along with the other 20 unpledged delegates, voted for Obama at the 2012 Democratic National Convention in Charlotte, North Carolina.

Republican

The Republican primary took place on February 28, 2012, the same day as the Arizona Republican primary. Former Massachusetts Governor Mitt Romney won both of these elections.

This Michigan election used a semi-open primary system (which the state referred to as "closed") in which each voter made a public declaration at their election site and received the ballot for the appropriate party, rather than the fully open system used in the past. The state had 7,286,556 registered voters as of February 15, and delegates were awarded proportionately.

Michigan was given 59 delegates to the Republican (GOP) national convention, but that number was reduced to 30 as a penalty for bringing the election date forward before March 6 as the GOP rules set. The candidate with the greatest number of votes in each of the 14 congressional districts will receive that district's two delegates. Two additional delegates for Michigan were announced by the media to be given proportionally before the election but after the election the Michigan GOP announced there had been an error in the memo published and that the two delegates will be given to the winner, which sparked accusations of Mitt Romney rigging the results from Rick Santorum's team.

Polling

Campaign
While Romney has close ties to Michigan, where he was born and grew up and his father was the Governor, Santorum, who once trailed Romney badly in the state, had a clear lead over him in mid February after Santorum won Colorado, Minnesota, and Missouri caucuses and primary on February 7. And the competition became a statistical tie between these two candidates before the primary.

Since Michigan allows primary voters to declare their affiliation at the time they vote, Santorum campaign paid for robo-calls inviting Democrats to  cross over and vote for him. Romney called this tactic "outrageous" and "disgusting" but Santorum defended himself as not doing anything wrong but getting people to vote in an open primary.

Some Democrats also urged their supporters to vote for Santorum in the Republican primary, in hopes of forcing the Republican candidates to use more resources and help make it easier for Barack Obama to win the general election. This is similar to Rush Limbaugh's "Operation Chaos", where Limbaugh urged voters in the 2008 Democratic Presidential primaries to vote for Hillary Clinton, whom he saw as being a weaker candidate than Obama. Michigan has a long history of such crossover voting; in 2000, strong Democratic crossover votes helped Senator John McCain win the Michigan Republican primary. In 1972, Republican crossover votes propelled Governor George Wallace to victory in the Democratic primary.

Results
Polls closed at 8 PM local time on election day. While most of the state is in the Eastern time zone (UTC −5), four counties in the Upper Peninsula are on Central time (UTC −6), so the final closures came at 9 PM Eastern time. As of 2/28, results showed Romney winning 7 congressional districts and Santorum winning 7.

At the Republican state convention in May, it was reported that of the 30 voting delegates for the national convention in Tampa, 6 were Paul supporters, and 24 were Romney supporters. Paul organizers disputed these numbers, stating that they had actually taken 8 (instead of 6) of the voting delegates, plus several non-voting slots.

Delegate allocation controversy
A controversy arose over the delegate allocation in Michigan, where 28 congressional district delegates and two at-large delegates were awarded. The Republican Party of Michigan rules stated that the two at-large delegates would be awarded proportionally, meaning that Santorum and Romney would get one delegate each for a 15–15 tie. But the following day the party's credentials committee allocated both at-large delegates to Romney, saying it had changed the rules a few weeks prior to award the delegates to the statewide winner but "in error" sent a memo to the candidates saying they would be awarded proportionately. Santorum's campaign protested, saying the committee's six members were mostly Romney supporters, and filed a protest with the Republican National Committee. Santorum's general counsel wrote in a letter to the RNC, "It is our understanding that several public supporters and Michigan surrogates of an opposing campaign voted in favor of the delegate allocation change which assisted their chosen candidate. This request is not about the allocation of a single delegate; it is about ensuring a transparent process, avoiding unscrupulous tactics and backroom deals by establishment figures and campaigns who have not received the result they hoped for at the ballot box." Committee member and former state attorney general Mike Cox endorsed Romney, but said the delegates should have been awarded 15-15: "I have this crazy idea that you follow the rules. I'd love to give the at-large delegates to Mitt Romney, but our rules provide for strict apportionment."

General election

Candidate ballot access
 Mitt Romney/Paul Ryan, Republican
 Barack Obama/Joseph Biden, Democratic
 Virgil Goode/Jim Clymer, US Taxpayers
 Jill Stein/Cheri Honkala, Green
 Rocky Anderson/Luis J. Rodriguez, Natural Law
Write-in candidate access:
 Gary Johnson/James P. Gray, Libertarian

Results

Results by county

Counties that flipped from Democratic to Republican 

 Alger (largest city: Munising)
 Alpena (largest city: Alpena)
 Arenac (largest city: Standish)
 Benzie (largest city: Frankfort)
 Berrien (largest city: Niles)
 Cass (largest city: Dowagiac)
 Clare (largest city: Clare)
 Clinton (largest city: St. Johns)
 Delta (largest city: Escanaba)
 Gladwin (largest city: Gladwin)
 Gratiot (largest city: Alma)
 Iosco (largest city: East Tawas)
 Iron (largest city: Iron River)
 Jackson (largest city: Jackson)
 Kent (largest city: Grand Rapids)
 Leelanau (largest settlement: Greilickville)
 Lenawee (largest city: Adrian)
 Mason (largest city: Ludington)
 Menominee (largest city: Menominee)
 Oceana (largest city: Hart)
 Ogemaw (largest city: West Branch)
 Ontonagon (largest village: Ontonagon)
 Presque Isle (largest city: Rogers City)
 Roscommon (largest settlement: Houghton Lake)
 Schoolcraft (largest city: Manistique)
 St. Clair (largest city: Port Huron)

Results by congressional district

Despite losing the state, Mitt Romney won 9 of 14 congressional districts.

Analysis 
All of the local polling firms had predicted a close election here, some even giving an advantage to native Michigander Romney over Obama; however, statistician Nate Silver pointed out several problems with the local pollsters' methodology and sampling errors, instead giving more credence to the national pollsters who posited a clear victory for Obama (by a mean of 7.3 points and a median of 7.0 over Romney).

In the end, Silver and the National pollsters were correct: Obama defeated Romney by over 9 points in the November 2012 election. Obama dominated the population centers that had traditionally anchored Democratic strength in the state—Detroit, Lansing, Ann Arbor, and Flint—but he also retained two populous counties that had been Republican strongholds in the 1970s and 1980s, the Detroit-area suburban counties of Oakland and Macomb. Even in Kent County, which flipped back to the Republican column, Romney substantially underperformed what Bush had done in 2000 and 2004. While Romney did better in more rural areas, without better strength in some of the state's population centers, Romney was unable to flip the state.

As of 2020, this is the last time the Democratic candidate won Bay, Calhoun, Eaton, Gogebic, Isabella, Lake, Macomb, Manistee, Monroe, Shiawassee, and Van Buren counties.

See also
 United States presidential elections in Michigan
 2012 Republican Party presidential primaries
 Timeline of the 2012 United States presidential election
 2012 Republican Party presidential debates and forums
 Results of the 2012 Republican Party presidential primaries
 Michigan Republican Party

References

External links
The Green Papers: for Michigan
The Green Papers: Major state elections in chronological order.

Michigan
United States president
2012